Noites Cariocas (Noches cariocas in Argentina) is a 1936  Brazilian-Argentine comedy film directed and written by Enrique Cadícamo. It is based on a story by F. Gianetti.  The film was released in both Portuguese and Spanish.

Main cast
Eduardo Arouca   
Mendonça Balsemão   
Montenegro Bentes   
Lourdinha Bittencourt   
Sadi Cabral   
Carambola   
Walter D'Ávila   
Olavo de Barros   
Abel Dourado   
Silva Filho   
Chaves Florence   
Jardel Jercolis   
Ana Maria Machado   
Carlos Machado   
Conceição Machado   
Mesquitinha   
Oscarito   
Grande Otelo   
Maria Luisa Palomero   
Carlos Perelli   
Lita Prado   
Pery Ribas   
Henriqueta Romanita   
Albertina Salkovsa   
Lódia Silva   
Manoel Vieira   
Carlos Vivan

External links

1936 films
1930s Portuguese-language films
1930s Spanish-language films
Argentine black-and-white films
Brazilian black-and-white films
Films directed by Enrique Cadícamo
Brazilian comedy films
1936 comedy films
Argentine comedy films
1936 multilingual films
Argentine multilingual films
Brazilian multilingual films
1930s Argentine films